In differential geometry, the Kosmann lift, named after Yvette Kosmann-Schwarzbach, of a vector field  on a Riemannian manifold  is the canonical projection  on the orthonormal frame bundle of its natural lift  defined on the bundle of linear frames.

Generalisations exist for any given reductive G-structure.

Introduction
If one denotes by  the canonical embedding, then  is a section of the pullback bundle , where

Let us assume that we are given a  Kosmann decomposition of the pullback bundle ,  such that

Definition

Let  be the oriented orthonormal frame bundle of an oriented -dimensional 
Riemannian manifold  with given metric .
By definition, one may say that we are given with a classical reductive -structure.

Let  be the canonical embedding.
 
One then can prove that there exists a canonical Kosmann decomposition of the pullback bundle  such that

See also
 Frame bundle
 Orthonormal frame bundle
 Principal bundle
 Spin bundle
 Connection (mathematics)
 G-structure
 Spin manifold
 Spin structure

Notes

References
 
 

 

Fiber bundles
Vector bundles
Riemannian geometry
Structures on manifolds